Ahua is a genus of South Pacific funnel weavers first described by Raymond Robert Forster & C. L. Wilton in 1973.

Species
 it contains four species:
Ahua dentata Forster & Wilton, 1973 — New Zealand
Ahua insula Forster & Wilton, 1973 — New Zealand
Ahua kaituna Forster & Wilton, 1973 — New Zealand
Ahua vulgaris Forster & Wilton, 1973 — New Zealand

References

Agelenidae
Araneomorphae genera
Spiders of New Zealand
Taxa named by Raymond Robert Forster